Henare Raumoa Te Huatahi Balneavis   (26 March 1880 – 13 May 1940) was a New Zealand interpreter, private secretary and public administrator of Māori descent. Through his mother Te Rina Matewai he was connected to Ngai Tamanuhiri, Ngati Kahungunu, and Ngati Rakaipaaka; through his father he was connected to Te Whakatohea iwi.

Early life
In 1895 Balneavis attended Te Aute College. After he left, Balneavis was employed by William Lee Rees at his office in Gisborne. Balneavis then trained as an interpreter, graduating in 1903. He was then appointed as a clerk and interpreter in the Native Land Court at Gisborne.

Life as a public servant

Balneavis indispensable skills and talents would eventually lead to his promotion to higher office. In 1909, Āpirana Ngata employed Balneavis as his private secretary. Marking the start of his 28 year long career as private secretary to the Minister of Native Affairs in 1912; serving under Ngata, William Herries, Gordon Coates, George Forbes, and Michael Joseph Savage. Balneavis ensured that where ministers could not be influenced that there were aware of Maori issues and concerns.

Balneavis had an interest in all forms of Maori cultural activity, and became the first secretary to the Maori Ethnological Research, which then merged into the Maori Purposes Fund Board and at one stage he became a secretary for the Polynesian Society. 13 May 1946

Honours
In July 1927, to mark the visit of the Duke and Duchess of York to New Zealand, Balneavis was appointed a Member of the Royal Victorian Order.

Marriage
Balneavis married Irma Leah Wallace in 1928. The couple had no children, and Irma Balneavis died in 1949, nine years after her husband.

References

1880 births
1940 deaths
Interpreters
Ngāi Tāmanuhiri people
Ngati Rakaipaaka people
Ngāti Kahungunu people
Whakatōhea people
New Zealand Māori public servants
People from Muriwai
People from the Gisborne District
New Zealand Members of the Royal Victorian Order
20th-century translators